Scuola Superiore di Catania (SSC) is an education institute in Italy. It was founded in 1998 followed by the model of Scuola Normale Superiore di Pisa.

Scuola Superiore di Catania
The aims of Scuola Superiore di Catania are:
  to develop the skills of its students through additional courses, seminars and the precocious start of research activity.
  to provide a synthesis of teaching, research and employment.

Students, acknowledged by passing a public selection process, live up for free upon the school structures.

In 2004, after a positive evaluation of the Ministry of Education, University, and Research, Scuola Superiore was institutionalized within University of Catania.

In September 2006 several ex-students founded their own association, called “Alumni Scuola Superiore di Catania”.

Students

The students of Scuola Superiore di Catania are also students of University of Catania and, thus, have to attend its courses. Students are required to maintain good academic standing in their exams (an average grade of at least 27/30 with no grade below 24/30) in order to maintain their scholarship. Moreover, apart from the normal courses they are required to attend seven internal courses, two of which are interdisciplinary, held by professors affiliated to University of Catania or to other institutions (both Italian or foreign). Scuola Superiore provides each ordinary student with free board and lodging housing, the reimbursement of tuition fees, and a monthly monetary contribution.

The students are actively involved in the organization of their everyday life. They are able to manage the library services, organize a book society, cinematographic review, cultural meetings, conferences, and sport activities.

Scuola Superiore have approximately ninety undergraduate students and fifty postgraduate once. The origin of the majority of the students is Sicily, but some of them come also from other regions of Italy, or even other countries (mostly Mediterranean ones).

Residence

Scuola Superiore is currently located in Villa San Saverio, a rebuilt nineteenth-century noble palace and in order to act as a small independent campus. Students live in single or double rooms. Among the services offered to the students there are: canteen, library, free Internet connection, multimedia rooms, leisure rooms, a football pitch, and a volleyball field.

Admission

The admission procedure, which usually takes place in September, consists of two written tests and an oral exam which focus on the subjects chosen by the candidate (namely: scientific or humanistic subjects). In order to be admitted to the oral exam, it is necessary to obtain a minimum average score of 7/10 in the written tests. Within the oral test, the knowledge of English is also gauged.

During the admission procedure, Scuola Superiore offers board and lodging to those candidates coming from other regions or countries. In winter and summer Scuola Superiore organizes short periods of educational guidance for high school students.

Internal courses

During their undergraduate career, students of Scuola Superiore must successfully attend a minimum of seven internal courses. Five of them must deal with specific topics belonging to a degree course, while the remaining two of them are interdisciplinary, regarding topics which can be of interest for students belonging to different contexts  (e.g. neuroinformatics, rhetoric, contemporary history). Specialist courses are proposed by teachers and students together, and have to be approved by the didactic panel of the Scuola Superiore.

Apart from the courses mentioned above, students must also attend auxiliary courses of foreign languages and computer science. Concerning the foreign language ones, students attend English courses in order to obtain an international certification. Moreover, apart from English, students have to attend another foreign language course chosen among French, German, and Spanish.

Scuola Superiore promotes study and research activities abroad by funding international mobility and stages with public and private companies or universities.

Laboratories
Scuola Superiore used to comprise the following laboratories
  Laboratory for the Protection of the Human Rights
  Laboratory of Design of the Landscape
  Complex Systems Laboratory

International PhDs
The following International PhDs used to be activated at Scuola Superiore:
  Energy;
  Nanoscience;
  Stem cell research;
  Global politics and European Integration;
  Nuclear physics and Particle Astrophysics;

Alumni

In September 2006 the Association of ex-students of Scuola Superiore was founded, with the name “Alumni Scuola Superiore di Catania”. The Association aims to maintain relationships between former students and contributing to the purposes of Scuola Superiore by promoting activities for current students. The Scientific Director of the Scuola Superiore is an honorary member of the association. As of September 2009, the Association is composed by 42 members. Among its activities, the meetings of professional guidance are important occasions in which the ex-students expose a clear outlook of postgraduate choices in Italy and abroad.

See also
 Catania
 University of Catania
 Scuola Normale Superiore di Pisa

References

External links
  SSC - Scuola Superiore di Catania
  Unict.it - Official website of University of Catania

Catania
Education in Catania